Middle Ord is a small hamlet, between West Ord and East Ord, and west of the town of Berwick upon Tweed, Northumberland England. The population as of March 2008, is nineteen residents within seven dwellings, centered on Middle Ord Manor House.

Governance 
Middle Ord is in the parliamentary constituency of Berwick-upon-Tweed.

References

External links

Villages in Northumberland